The following is a list of episodes from the anime My-HiME. The opening theme is Shining☆Days by Minami Kuribayashi, which is also used as the ending theme in the final episode. The ending theme is You were the Sky (君が空だった kimi ga sora datta?) by Aki Misato, though episode 15 uses It's only the fairy tale by Yuko Miyamura.

List of episodes

Mai-HiME
My-HiME